The EMS Memorial College of Applied Science is a college located at Kelanpeetika hilly village near Vallithode,  east of Iritty along the Thalassery-Kodagu inter state highway. It is affiliated to Kannur University and run by the Institute of Human Resources Development. It was established in 2009.

References

External Links
 CAS Iritty- college website
 Institute of Human Resources Development (IHRD) - website

Arts and Science colleges in Kerala
Colleges affiliated to Kannur University
Institute of Human Resources Development
Universities and colleges in Kannur district
Educational institutions established in 2009
2009 establishments in Kerala